A radiological information system (RIS) is the core system for the electronic management of imaging departments. The major functions of the RIS can include patient scheduling, resource management, examination performance tracking, reporting, results distribution, and procedure billing. RIS complements HIS (hospital information systems) and PACS (picture archiving and communication system), and is critical to efficient workflow to radiology practices.

Basic features 
Radiological information systems commonly support the following features:
Patient registration and scheduling
Patient list management
Modality interface using worklists
Workflow management within a department of radiology
Request and document scanning
Result entry
Digital reporting (usually using Voice Recognition (VR))
Printables like patient letters and printed reports
Result transmission via HL7 integration or e-mailing of clinical reports
Patient tracking
Interactive documents
Creation of technical files
Modality and material management
Consent management

Additional features 
In addition a RIS often supports the following:
Appointment booking
Voice Recognition (VR)
PACS workflow
Custom report creation
HL7 interfaces with a PACS.  HL7 also enables communication between HIS and RIS in addition to RIS and PACS.
Critical findings notification
Billing
Rule engines
Cross site workflow

See also
 Electronic health record (EHR)
 Medical imaging
 Medical software

References

Radiology
Medical databases
Electronic health records